Acanthopoma annectens is a species of catfish (order Siluriformes) of the family Trichomycteridae, and the only species of the genus Acanthopoma. This fish grows to about 12 centimetres (4.7 in) SL and originates from the upper and middle Amazon River. This species is parasitic, attacking like a leech and leaving wounds all over the fish which it attacks; it spreads a bundle of opercular and inter-opercular spines into the wound and remains there and is difficult to remove. It may invade parts of wading or swimming animals but apparently exist in these passages only for a short while, as they quickly die from a lack of oxygen.

References

Trichomycteridae
Fish of South America
Fish of the Amazon basin
Taxa named by Christian Frederik Lütken
Fish described in 1892